The blunt-eared bat or Peruvian crevice-dwelling bat (Tomopeas ravus) is a species of bat in the family Molossidae. It is monotypic within the genus Tomopeas and subfamily Tomopeatinae. It is endemic to Peru, where it is considered critically endangered.  It is threatened by habitat loss.

Taxonomy and etymology
The classification of the blunt-eared bat has historically been problematic. When it was first described by Gerrit Smith Miller Jr. in 1900, it was placed in Vespertilionidae. 
In 1970, it was proposed that it should be in its own family, due to its intermediate qualities between Vespertilionidae and Molossidae.
Taxonomists continued to place it in the vesper bat family until a 1994 study of their mitochondrial DNA showed that they were better placed in Molossidae.
It is now widely recognized as the only member of subfamily Tomopeatinae of family Molossidae.
There is evidence that it is basal to all other genera of the Molossidae.

Its genus name Tomopeas is possibly a reference to the Malay word "mops", meaning "bat"; Miller used "mops" in other genera he described, including Eumops and Nyctinomops.
Ravus is Latin for tawny.

Description
Their fur is pale yellowish-gray in color, while their flight membranes are dark.
Their face and ears are also dark in color.
Their ventral fur is lighter than their dorsal fur, and is a creamy buff color.
The uropatagium is sparsely furred on both its dorsal and ventral sides.
Like other free-tailed bats, the blunt-eared bat has a blunt tragus, a small but defined antitragus, tubular nostrils, and fusion of the seventh cervical and first thoracic vertebrae.
They are extremely small in size, weighing only .
Males and females are similar in size.
The calcar forms a small but distinct lobe, and its keel is narrow and inconspicuous.

Biology
As they are relatively uncommon, not much is known about their biology. Juveniles, lactating females, and lactating females have all been encountered in July and August, suggesting that this is a time of high reproductive activity.
They are insectivorous.
They have been found to be infected with the protozoan endoparasite Eimeria.
A new species of Eimeria was described from the blunt-eared bat; it was named Eimeria tomopea in reference to this fact.

Range and habitat
It is endemic to Peru.
Its range is restricted to the arid and semiarid regions of Peru's coastal region.
During the day, it roosts in the crevices of granite boulders and outcroppings.
The crevices they use are small, at only .
They possibly prefer crevices that face the west or southwest.
This capture was the first time the blunt-eared bat was observed in over thirty years.
A 2013 study suggested that their range might extend into southwest Ecuador, as the habitat would be similar to where they are found in Peru. So far, there is no evidence to confirm this.

Conservation
In Peru, it is considered critically endangered.
The International Union for Conservation of Nature assessed it as vulnerable in 1996 and 2008, but revised its classification to endangered in 2016.
They identify habitat destruction as the primary threat to this species; its habitat is being lost to agricultural conversion and urbanization.
This species is possibly under threat by efforts to control vampire bats. Sometimes, entire caves are fumigated, which kills all the bats inside.
In 2013, bat researchers reported capturing two individuals with "relatively little sampling effort," causing them to question if the species is actually rare or if it is not encountered due to inappropriate sampling methods.

References

Taxa named by Gerrit Smith Miller Jr.
Bats of South America
Mammals described in 1900
EDGE species
Mammals of Peru
Molossidae
Taxonomy articles created by Polbot